Natchitoches is a small city and the parish seat of Natchitoches Parish, Louisiana, United States. Established in 1714 by Louis Juchereau de St. Denis as part of French Louisiana, the community was named after the indigenous Natchitoches people.

The City of Natchitoches was incorporated on February 5, 1819, after Louisiana had become a state in 1812. It is the oldest permanent settlement in the land acquired by the Louisiana Purchase. Natchitoches is home to Northwestern State University. Its sister city is  Nacogdoches, Texas.

History

Early years
Natchitoches was established in 1714 by Canadien explorer Louis Juchereau de St. Denis. It is the oldest permanent European settlement within the borders of the 1803 Louisiana Purchase. Natchitoches was founded as a French outpost on the Red River for trade with Spanish-controlled Mexico; French traders settled there as early as 1699. The post was established near a village of Natchitoches Indians, after whom the city was named. Early settlers were French Catholic immigrants and creoles (originally meaning those ethnic French born in the colony). French creoles acquired lands that were developed in the antebellum years as cotton-producing Magnolia Plantation and Oakland Plantation. Each has been preserved and is designated as a National Historic Landmark.

After the United States' Louisiana Purchase of 1803, migration into the territory increased from the US. Natchitoches grew along with the population in the parish. Initially, the Americans were primarily of English and Scots-Irish ancestry and of Protestant faith. They developed several cotton plantations along the Red River. Numerous enslaved African Americans were brought to the area through the domestic slave trade to work the cotton, and provide all other skills on these plantations, generating the revenues for the wealthy planters before the Civil War.

The United States Government established a federal fur trade factory here in 1805. It was removed to Sulphur Fork, Arkansas in 1818.

In the 1820s and early 1830s, Natchitoches also served as a freight transfer point for cotton shipped from parts of east Texas. Cotton shippers used a land route crossing the Sabine River to Natchitoches, where the freight was transferred to boats, and floated down the Red River to New Orleans.

When the course of the Red River shifted, it bypassed Natchitoches and cut off its lucrative connection with the Mississippi River. A  oxbow lake was left in the river's previous location which became known as Cane River Lake.

Civil War
During the Civil War, Natchitoches was set on fire by Union soldiers who retreated through the town after their failed attempt to capture Shreveport. Confederate cavalry pursued the fleeing soldiers and arrived in time to help extinguish the flames before the town was destroyed. Alexandria was destroyed by Union troops in 1864, but both Union and Confederate troops were responsible for severely damaging plantations along the river during the war, including Magnolia and Oakland. 
In the spring of 1863, Confederate General Richard Taylor and his men passed through Natchitoches en route to Shreveport. Andrew W. Hyatt, one of Taylor's line officers, wrote in his diary: "reaching the banks of Cane River. ... We are now on a regular race from the enemy, and are bound for Grand Ecore. ..." Three days later on May 11, 1863, Hyatt penned: "We have now retreated 280 miles. Natchitoches is quite a 'town,' and the galleries were crowded with pretty women, who waved us a kind reception as we passed through the town."

Around Natchitoches, 12,556 bales of Confederate cotton were stored. A match factory also opened in the city during the war. The residents of Natchitoches often engaged in fund-raising activities to relieve the destitute during the war. Historian John D. Winters observed, "Eggnog parties and other social affairs during the Christmas holiday season lifted the morale of civilians, as well as that of the soldiers."

Reconstruction
Radford Blunt published the Natchitoches Republican. He was also a candidate for the state legislature. William H. Tunnard edited the paper.

20th century
As the parish seat, Natchitoches suffered from the decline in agricultural population through the mid-20th century, and grew at a markedly lower rate after 1960. The mechanization of agriculture had reduced the number of workers needed, and many moved to cities for jobs. By the early 1970s, the town's businesses were declining, along with many area farms, and buildings were boarded up.

In the mid-1970s, Mayor Bobby DeBlieux and other preservationists believed that attracting tourists to the area, based on its historic assets of nearly intact plantations and numerous historic buildings, could be a key to attracting visitors, reviving the town, and stimulating new businesses. Over the years, he worked with a variety of landowners and local people to gain support for designating a historic district in the city. He also supported making a national park out of the working area of Magnolia Plantation, which had many surviving outbuildings from the 19th century, and from Oakland Plantation, both downriver in the parish.

By the end of the 20th century, the mile-long French colonial area of downtown, which lies along Cane Lake, was designated as a National Historic District. Many buildings were adapted as antique shops, restaurants and souvenir emporiums. To accommodate tourists, the town had 32 bed-and-breakfast inns, the highest in the state. By 2018, that number had increased to 50.

The plantation country surrounds Cane River Lake. The markedly intact downriver Magnolia and Oakland plantations were designated as National Historic Landmarks, and are part of what has been developed as the Cane River Creole National Historical Park, which was authorized in 1994, with the support of US Senator J. Bennett Johnston. He was a cousin by marriage of Betty Hertzog, the last of the family to live in the great house at Magnolia.

Tours and interpretive programs at both sites continue to attract visitors, especially as they grapple with telling the difficult history of slavery and its aftermath at the plantations. They also cover the contributions of blacks and Creoles of color to the community.

Since the late 20th century, the 35-mile oxbow lake has served as the spring-break training location for numerous university crew teams, from universities such as the University of St. Thomas, Kansas State University, University of Kansas, Wichita State University, Murray State University, University of Central Oklahoma, and Washington University in St. Louis, as well as Northwestern State University. In the spring of 2018, LSU, Alabama, Texas and Georgia were also represented. Tourists interested in sports often visit in this period to watch the sports teams.

Over the years, the city and parish have improved conditions with a riverbank stabilization project and a water pump project to improve water levels in the lake. This directs water from Hampton Lake into Bayou Possiant, which feeds Cane River Lake.

In March 1965, nine children were among seventeen people killed in a natural gas pipeline explosion.

Natchitoches was the site of the 1973 plane crash that claimed the life of singer-songwriter Jim Croce. Croce had performed a concert on campus for Northwestern State University students at Prather Coliseum. He was killed less than an hour later in a plane headed to Sherman, Texas. The crash may have been a result of the pilot suffering a fatal heart attack.

21st century
In 2005, the cartoonist and historian Pap Dean published Historic Natchitoches: Beauty of the Cane, a study of the history, people, and attractions of the historic city. Harrisonburg, the seat of Catahoula Parish, is the other earliest French settlement in the state.

Natchitoches is the home of the oldest general store in Louisiana, the still operating Kaffie-Frederick, Inc., General Mercantile, located on Front Street. The store was co-founded in 1863 by ancestors of Alexandria businessman and former city commissioner Arnold Jack Rosenthal (1923–2010). It has been featured in several nationally televised reality shows such as Duck Dynasty and Cajun Pawn, with the words "If you can't find it anywhere else, you can probably find it at Kaffie-Fredrick."

Geography

A 35-mi-long (56 km) lake was formed from a portion of the Red River when it changed course. It is now known as Cane River Lake. The municipal water supply comes from nearby Sibley Lake, a formerly drained wetland dammed in 1962, which also offers fishing and boating.

Geology
Soils in this area are a combination of leaf mold and red clays, sand, and sediments. The area is part of the Chestnut Salt Dome.

Cityscape
Though Natchitoches has few multistorey buildings, it has retained much of its historic European-style architecture listed on the National Register of Historic Places as the Natchitoches Historic District. The city is a mesh of wrought iron, stucco, and red brick. The city still has one of the original brick streets (Front Street), which the historical society protects from alterations. The city of Natchitoches recently completed a restoration project to repair the century-old brick street. During this process, workers removed each brick one by one, numbered it, cleaned it, and then replaced it after utilities, drainage, and the foundation were repaired beneath.

Climate

Weather-wise, Natchitoches lies in a boundary region that separates the plains of Texas from the consistently humid Gulf Coast. This gives summers both heat and humidity. Winters in Natchitoches are relatively mild, with measurable snowfall once every 5–10 years. Natchitoches averages  of rain per year. The city is in an area that frequently experiences severe thunderstorms, hail, damaging winds, and tornadoes.

Demographics

2020 census

As of the 2020 United States Census, there were 18,039 people, 6,222 households, and 2,773 families residing in the city.

2010 census
As of the 2010 census,  18,323 people, 6,705 households, and 3,631 families were residing in the city. The 7,906 housing units averaged 312.2 per sq mi (120.5/km2). The racial makeup of the city was 59.0% African American, 36.4% White, 0.5% Native American, 0.6% Asian, 0.42% from other races, and 1.5% from two or more races. Hispanics or Latinos of any race was 1.7% of the population.

Of the 6,113 households, 30.4% had children under the age of 18 living with them, 34.3% were married couples living together, 21.5% had a female householder with no husband present, and 40.6% were not families. About 30.8% of all households were made up of individuals, and 11.3% had someone living alone who was 65 years of age or older. The average household size was 2.50, and the average family size was 3.18.

In the city, the age distribution was 23.6% under the age of 18, 27.2% from 18 to 24, 21.8% from 25 to 44, 16.0% from 45 to 64, and 11.4% who were 65 years of age or older. The median age was 24.5 years. For every 100 females, there were 85.0 males. For every 100 females age 18 and over, there were 80.2 males.

The median income for a household in the city was $23,261, and for a family was $30,396. Males had a median income of $28,601 versus $17,859 for females. The per capita income for the city was $12,642. About 26.7% of families and 34.8% of the population were below the poverty line, including 45.0% of those under age 18 and 19.2% of those aged 65 or over.

Economy

Following continued population decline in the area, in part due to mechanization of agriculture, by the 1970s, Natchitoches had suffered an economic downturn that resulted in a 65% vacancy in the commercial district. Because of efforts to revitalize the city and emphasize its unique historic assets, as described above, vacancy is now about 1%.

The Port of Natchitoches—a river port on the Red River—is located off the eastbound part of U.S. Route 84, just outside Natchitoches. The port exports lumber from yards onsite, as forestry is a major industry in the area, as well.

Natchitoches Regional Airport serves cities (via FBO) such as Baton Rouge, New Orleans, Dallas, Houston, Little Rock, Monroe, and Shreveport. It is adjacent to Northwestern State University; together, they offer flight training. The airport is under renovation to become one of the country's most advanced non-towered airports.

The Natchitoches National Fish Hatchery is based here. They handle over six species of fish and other wildlife. The parish attracts numerous sports fishermen during the seasons.

The Natchitoches Christmas Festival is a well-known celebration of the holidays for locals. The festival is held on the river.

Since completion of Interstate 49, many business have either moved or have been built outside the city's central area. Gas stations and hotels have developed in this area and serve many of the Natchitoches Christmas Festival visitors.

In 1998, Natchitoches was named one of the top six places in the United States to retire by Kiplinger's Personal Finance Magazine.

Tourism
The Cane River National Heritage Area is a  area which includes many sites such as Oakland Plantation, Melrose Plantation, Badin-Roque House, Magnolia Plantation, Kate Chopin House, Cherokee Plantation, Cane River Heritage Scenic Byway, Fort St. Jean Baptiste State Historic Site, National Historic Landmark District (Old Courthouse Museum, Bishop Martin Museum, Landmarks in Time Exhibit), and  Los Adaes State Historic Site. Because of this richness of culture, the area is one of the destinations on the Louisiana African American Heritage Trail newly designated by the state.

Natchitoches, a popular tourism area of the state, is equipped to serve visitors with 11 national chain hotels, and 27 bed-and-breakfast inns, including the Steel Magnolia House.

Natchitoches attracts over one million visitors annually. The city is known as a retiree-friendly city. In 2006, Natchitoches was awarded the Great American Main Street Award for the effort the community has put into revitalizing and restoring much of the historic district.

The city's tourism center is the downtown river walk. This includes Front Street, which becomes Jefferson at the Texas Street light. Front Street is the jewel of the city. It overlooks the river walk and is bordered by an assortment of shops and boutiques. The city has identified this area as its historical district. The Historical Society maintains the area through regulations on changes and restorations. Natchitoches has a mini "Walk of Fame" located in the historical district of the city.

While visiting the area, tourists may notice many unusual structures; these are many of the Natchitoches Christmas Festival lights. The city recently built a small convention center located on Second Street, which holds many city events.

The Bayou Pierre Alligator Park is a major tourist attraction, where tourists may feed the alligators and dine and shop. The park teaches school children to respect nature and to conserve its many habitats. Natchitoches is home to a branch of the Kisatchie National Forest, a designation promoted by naturalist Caroline Dormon to preserve regional natural wonders.

Opened December 2005, the Natchitoches Events Center is in the Natchitoches National Historic Landmark District. Located at 750 Second Street, the facility has a  meeting facility, a  exhibit hall with three meeting rooms, a board room, and a full-sized catering kitchen.

National Guard
A Troop 2-108TH CAV is headquartered behind the local college and the airport. This unit has been deployed twice to Iraq, first as part of the 1-156TH Armor Battalion in 2004–2005, and then as part of the 2-108TH CAV SQDN in 2010. Both times, this company-sized unit deployed with the 256th Infantry Brigade.,

Arts and culture
The Natchitoches Meat Pie is one of the official state foods of Louisiana. It is known as a regional delicacy of North Louisiana. (See List of U.S. state foods.)

Natchitoches has long been known for its popular Christmas lighting festival which is held the first Saturday in December. The lights continue to brighten the Cane River until after New Year's Day. In 2019 the festival celebrated its 93rd year.

Education

Colleges and universities
 Northwestern State University
 Louisiana Scholars' College
 Louisiana Technical College

The Northwestern Campus is also home to the Louisiana Scholars' College, the state's designated honors college for the study of the liberal arts and sciences. As a part of its effort to become a global campus, NSU is a sister university with many universities in Asia.

Natchitoches Parish is in the service area of Bossier Parish Community College.

Primary and secondary schools

Public schools 
Natchitoches Parish School Board operates many public schools. They include:
 East Natchitoches Elementary/Middle School
 George L. Parks Elementary
 L.P. Vaughn Elementary
 M.R. Weaver Elementary
 NSU Elementary/Middle Laboratory School
 Natchitoches Junior High—Frankie Ray Jackson School
 Natchitoches Magnet School
 Natchitoches Central High School

The city is also home to the Louisiana School for Math, Science, and the Arts, a public residential honors high school.

Private schools
St. Mary's High School is in Natchitoches.

Media

Newspaper 

 Natchitoches Times

Radio 

The only AM radio station based in Natchitoches is KNOC 1450, a classic country music station

FM broadcasting

Infrastructure

Health care
Natchitoches Regional Medical Center is a 78-bed facility that includes 45 medical/surgical beds and a 112-bed skilled nursing home.
Rehabilitation treatment is at the PRISM Center for physical, occupational and speech therapy, sports medicine, industrial medicine, wound care and more.

Notable people

 Jack Berly (1903–1977), a Major League Baseball pitcher
 Curtis Boozman (1898–1979), served two nonconsecutive terms in the Louisiana House of Representatives from Natchitoches, 1952 to 1956 and 1960 to 1964.
 Leopold Caspari, businessman, banker, and member of both houses of the Louisiana State Legislature between 1884 and 1914
 Joanna Cassidy, Golden Globe award-winning actress.
 Monnie T. Cheves, NSU professor; member of the Louisiana House from Natchitoches Parish from 1952 to 1960
 Kate Chopin, a short story writer and novelist, managed a plantation in Cloutierville south of Natchitoches in the late 19th century for a time after the death of her husband.
 Charles Milton Cunningham (1877–1936), Natchitoches attorney, publisher of The Natchitoches Times, and member of the Louisiana State Senate from 1915 to 1922
 Milton Joseph Cunningham (1842–1916), attorney in Natchitoches and New Orleans, state representative and state senator from Natchitoches Parish, state attorney general for three nonconsecutive terms ending in 1900, father of Charles Milton Cunningham and grandfather of W. Peyton Cunningham
 William Tharp Cunningham (1871–1952), attorney, planter, state district court judge, state representative
 W. Peyton Cunningham (1901–1971), attorney and member of the Louisiana House from Natchitoches Parish from 1932 to 1940
 Jean Doerge, member of the Louisiana House of Representatives from Webster Parish, was born south of Natchitoches in 1937.
 George Doherty was a former professional football player who was the head coach of the Northwestern State University Demons from 1972 to 1974. The athletic offices are named in his honor.
 Caroline Dormon, a naturalist and preservationist, lived in Natchitoches Parish. She was the driving force behind the establishment of the Kisatchie National Forest.
 Steve Dowden, former football player.
 David Dumars, player of gridiron football
 Joe Dumars, NBA championship-winning player and general manager for the Detroit Pistons.
 Joseph Barton Elam, member of the United States House of Representatives from Louisiana's 4th congressional district, spent part of his childhood in Natchitoches
 Medford Bryan Evans (1907–1989), former professor at Northwestern State University; conservative political writer
 Dan Flores (born 1948), historian of the American West at the University of Montana in Missoula, Montana; obtained master's degree from NSU
 Paul Lee Foshee, Sr., a Natchitoches crop duster, served in the Louisiana House from 1960 to 1964 and the state Senate from 1972 to 1976.
 Sylvan Friedman, a farmer and rancher was a member of the Natchitoches Parish Police Jury from 1932 to 1944, the state House of Representatives from 1944 to 1952, and the Louisiana State Senate from 1952 to 1972. NSU named its student union building in his honor.
 Grits Gresham (1922–2008) was a nationally known sportsman, outdoorsman, author, and host of ABC's The American Sportsman television series from 1966 to 1979. A noted environmentalist, he resided on Cane River Lake.
 Robert Harling, a playwright and Hollywood screenwriter (born 1951), is a Natchitoches native. His Steel Magnolias is based on the life and death of his sister. Harling has also written First Wives Club, The Evening Star and Laws of Attraction.
 Bobby Hebert, football quarterback; New Orleans Saints Hall of Fame
 Robert Hilburn  (born 1939), biographer, and pop music critic for Los Angeles Times.
 George W. Jack, judge from 1917 until his death in 1924 of the United States District Court for the Western District of Louisiana, based in Shreveport; born in Natchitoches in 1875.
 Andrew R. Johnson (1856–1933), state senator from Bienville and Claiborne parishes from 1916 to 1924 and mayor of Homer, Louisiana, in the 1910s. He named the village of Ashland for Ashland, Wisconsin.
 Marques Johnson, basketball player on UCLA national championship team and for NBA's Milwaukee Bucks, Los Angeles Clippers, and Golden State Warriors.
 Donald G. Kelly, Natchitoches attorney who specializes in criminal law and retirement issues. He served in the Louisiana State Senate from 1976 to 1996.
 Pat Listach, MLB player for the Milwaukee Brewers and Houston Astros, coach and minor-league manager.
 Jimmy D. Long is a former Democratic member of the Louisiana House of Representatives who served from the Natchitoches-based district from 1968 to 2000. His younger brother, Gerald Long, is a Republican member of the Louisiana State Senate from a six-parish district also based about Natchitoches.
 Rickey L. Nowlin and Gerald Long are the first Republicans to represent Natchitoches Parish in the Louisiana House and Louisiana Senate since Reconstruction. They assumed their legislative seats on January 14, 2008. In 2007, Nowlin defeated Joe Sampite, a Democrat, for the right to succeed Representative Taylor Townsend, who failed in a Senate race against Gerald Long. Nowlin was unseated in a reconfigured district in 2011 but elected in 2012 as the first Natchitoches Parish president.
 Vern Roberson (born 1952), NFL player.
 Brittney Rogers (born 1982), Miss Louisiana USA 2003.
 Henry Hopkins Sibley (1816–1886) was a Confederate general in the American Civil War who commanded in Louisiana, Texas, and New Mexico.
 Ray Tarver (1921–1972), dentist who represented Natchitoches Parish in the Louisiana House of Representatives from 1964 to 1968.
 Charlie Tolar (1937–2003), pro football player for Houston Oilers.
 Thomas Taylor Townsend (born 1963). an attorney, served as the Natchitoches Parish state representative from 2000 to 2008.
 Trini Triggs (born 1965) is a country music singer born and reared in Natchitoches; holds occasional concerts on the Cane River.
 Arthur C. Watson (1909–1984) was a Natchitoches attorney who served in state House of Representatives from 1940 to 1944 and as chairman of Louisiana Democratic State Central Committee.
 A. L. Williams (born 1934), retired NSU and Louisiana Tech football coach; resided in Natchitoches, 1974–1982.
 J. Robert Wooley (born 1953), Natchitoches native but never lived in the city; Louisiana insurance commissioner, 2000–06.

Noted events

Natchitoches was the site of a gas pipeline explosion on March 4, 1965 that killed 17 people.

In 1973, singer-songwriter Jim Croce was killed when his plane crashed as it was leaving Natchitoches Regional Airport.

Natchitoches received numerous New Orleans evacuees due to Hurricane Katrina (2005). Many college students from New Orleans were transferred to Northwestern State University to continue their education.

In popular culture
Multiple movies have been filmed here, including:
 The Horse Soldiers (1959), starring William Holden and John Wayne. 
 Cane River (film) (1982), Horace B. Jenkins filmed Cane River in New Orleans and Natchitoches Parish.
 Steel Magnolias (1989), starring Julia Roberts, Sally Field, Daryl Hannah, Shirley MacLaine, Dolly Parton, and Olympia Dukakis
 The Man in the Moon (1991), starring Reese Witherspoon, Jason London, Sam Waterston, and Tess Harper
 12 Years a Slave (2013), four historic antebellum plantations were used in the film: Felicity, Magnolia, Bocage, and Destrehan. Magnolia, a plantation in Natchitoches, Louisiana, is just a few miles from one of the historic sites where Northup was held. "To know that we were right there in the place where these things occurred was so powerful and emotional," said actor Chiwetel Ejiofor. "That feeling of dancing with ghosts—it's palpable."

References

External links

 City of Natchitoches official city website
 What's in a Name: Natchitoches (LPB, 2006)
 

 
Cities in Natchitoches Parish, Louisiana
Parish seats in Louisiana
Cities in the Central Louisiana
Cities in the Ark-La-Tex
Populated places established in 1714
1714 establishments in New France
Cities in Louisiana